Saleh Abdullah al-Jubouri is an Iraqi independent politician who is the current Industry Minister in the Government of Adil Abdul-Mahdi.

He was approved by the Council of Representatives on 24 October 2018.

References 

Government ministers of Iraq
Living people
Year of birth missing (living people)